Menichelli is an Italian surname. Notable people with the surname include:

Edoardo Menichelli (born 1939), Italian Roman Catholic bishop and cardinal
Franco Menichelli (born 1941), Italian gymnast
Giampaolo Menichelli (born 1938), Italian footballer
Pina Menichelli (1890–1984), Italian actress
Roberto Menichelli (born 1963), Italian futsal player and coach

See also
24818 Menichelli, a main-belt asteroid

Italian-language surnames